IVL C.VI.25 was a Finnish fighter aircraft designed by IVL. It was a further development of the IVL C.24.

The aircraft made its maiden flight on June 11, 1925. The aircraft was wrecked after a forced landing, due to engine trouble, on December 17, 1925.

The aircraft was under-powered, like its predecessor, and it was not considered possible to further develop the aircraft.

Operators

Finnish Air Force

Specifications (C.VI.25)

See also

References

1920s Finnish fighter aircraft
High-wing aircraft
Single-engined tractor aircraft
Rotary-engined aircraft